The United States three cent piece was a unit of currency equaling  of a United States dollar. The mint produced two different three-cent coins for circulation: the three-cent silver and the three-cent nickel. Additionally, a three-cent bronze coin was made as a pattern in 1863. During the period from 1865 to 1873, both coins were minted, albeit in very small quantities for the silver three-cent piece.

History 

The three-cent coin was proposed in 1851 both as a result of the decrease in postage rates from five cents to three and to answer the need for a small-denomination, easy-to-handle coin. The three-cent silver featured a shield on a six-sided star on the obverse and the Roman numeral III on the reverse. The coin was initially composed of 75% silver and 25% copper to ensure that the coin would be considered real currency yet not worth melting down for the silver. The coins were physically the lightest-weight coins ever minted by the United States, weighing only 0.8 grams and with a diameter smaller than a modern dime and only slightly greater than the smallest gold dollars. The silver coins were known as "fishscales". The term "trimes" is often used today for these coins, and was first used by the director of the United States Mint (James Ross Snowden) at the time of their production.

Starting in 1854, the three-cent silver had its silver metal content raised to 90% to encourage circulation. At the same time, its weight was reduced to 0.75 grams by reducing thickness. The coin went through a design change at the time such that two lines were now used to border the star on the obverse and an olive sprig was added above and a bundle of arrows below the Roman numeral III on the reverse. A final design change occurred in 1859 because of striking problems: the number of lines bordering the star was reduced to one, and the font was made taller and slightly narrower. The size of the date numerals also varied through the years, with 1860–1863 featuring the smallest date numerals of any US coin. In 1851 only, the New Orleans Mint struck some of the silver three-cent coins. It was minted from 1851 to 1873 at the Philadelphia Mint. Later years had very small mintages and the 1873 issue was in proof state only, commanding prices upwards of $400. However, an earlier-date silver three-cent piece can be bought in worn condition for a relatively low price. The silver three-cent pieces can be purchased for around $25 if they are in decent shape and before 1862, depending on the mintage. The silver three-cent piece (along with the half dime, and the two-cent piece as well as the temporary suspension of the standard silver dollar in favor of the Trade Dollar) was discontinued by the Coinage Act of 1873.

Civil War-era silver shortages led to widespread hoarding of all silver coins, and most one- and five-cent coins, as well. Various alternatives were tried, including encapsulated postage and privately issued coinage. The Treasury eventually settled on issuing fractional currency. These small denomination (3 to 50 cent) notes were never popular, as they were easy to lose and unwieldy in large amounts. The answer to this issue was reached in 1865 with the introduction of the three-cent nickel coin, composed of copper and nickel and larger than the silver coin of the same denomination. The coin featured a Liberty head obverse and another Roman numeral III reverse. The three-cent nickel was never intended as a permanent issue, only as a stopgap measure until the wartime hoarding ceased. Production began to taper off in the 1870s (except for an anomalously large coinage in 1881), but mintage of the denomination did not finally end until 1889. One reason often given for the discontinuation of the three-cent nickel piece in 1889 is that this coin and the dime (10-cent silver coin) were identical in diameter. Another factor may have been that in 1883, the letter postage rate dropped to 2 cents, thus removing the justification for this coin.

The three-cent nickel was only minted in Philadelphia, and except for a larger date on the 1889 pieces, had no design differences throughout its run. Over the course of the series, mintage declined, and some of the dates are scarce, but with an 1865 mintage  over 11 million, a type piece can be inexpensively obtained.

Glass coins 
There was some discussion of minting a glass 3-cent coin to relieve the demand on copper during World War II.
It is possible other denomination glass coins were being considered as well.

Mintage figures 

Three cent (silver), 1851–1873

 1851 (P) – 5,447,400
 1851   O – 720,000
 1852 (P) – 18,663,500
 1853 (P) – 11,400,000
 1854 (P) – 671,000
 1855 (P) – 139,000
 1856 (P) – 1,458,000
 1857 (P) – 1,042,000
 1858 (P) – 1,603,700
 1859 (P) – 364,200
 1860 (P) – 286,000
 1861 (P) – 497,000
 1862 (P) – 343,000
 1863 (P) – 21,000
 1864 (P) – 12,000
 1865 (P) – 8,000
 1866 (P) – 22,000
 1867 (P) – 4,000
 1868 (P) – 3,500
 1869 (P) – 4,500
 1870 (P) – 3,000
 1871 (P) – 3,400
 1872 (P) – 1,000
 1873 (P) – 600 (all proof)

Three cent (nickel), 1865–1889

 1865 (P) – 11,382,000
 1866 (P) – 4,801,000
 1867 (P) – 3,915,000
 1868 (P) – 3,252,000
 1869 (P) – 1,604,000
 1870 (P) – 1,335,000
 1871 (P) – 604,000
 1872 (P) – 862,000
 1873 (P) – 1,173,000
 1874 (P) – 790,000
 1875 (P) – 228,000
 1876 (P) – 162,000
 1877 (P) – About 510 (all proof)
 1878 (P) – 2,350 (all proof)
 1879 (P) – 38,000
 1880 (P) – 21,000
 1881 (P) – 1,077,000
 1882 (P) – 22,200
 1883 (P) – 4,000
 1884 (P) – 1,700
 1885 (P) – 1,000
 1886 (P) – 4,290 (all proof)
 1887 (P) – 5,000
 1888 (P) – 36,500
 1889 (P) – 18,190

See also 

 Two-cent piece (United States)

References

Further reading

 Q. David Bowers, United States Three-Cent and Five-Cent Pieces: An Action Guide for the Collector and Investor. Wolfeboro, NH: Bowers and Merena Galleries, 1985.

External links 
 US Three Cent Piece by year and type. Histories, photos, and more.
 Three Cent Pictures
 Silver Three Cents: 1851–1873 – Type Set Coin Collecting
  About Glass Coins

Three-cent coins of the United States
1851 establishments in the United States